Amparo da Serra (formerly called Amparo do Serra) is a Brazilian municipality in the state of Minas Gerais. As of 2020 its population is estimated to be 4,678.

References

 Amparo da Serra

Municipalities in Minas Gerais